Pseudocordylus is a genus of small to large girdled lizards from South Africa, commonly known as crag lizards.  Six species of Pseudocordylus are known; they are distinguished from girdled lizards of the genus Cordylus by the presence of granular scales on the back instead of osteoderms.

Species
The following six species are recognized as being valid.

Pseudocordylus langi  – Lang's crag lizard
Pseudocordylus melanotus  – Common crag lizard 
Pseudocordylus microlepidotus  – Cape crag lizard 

Pseudocordylus spinosus  – Spiny crag lizard
Pseudocordylus subviridis  – Drakensberg crag lizard 
Pseudocordylus transvaalensis  – Northern crag lizard

Nota bene: A binomial authority in parentheses indicates that the species was originally described in a genus other than Pseudocordylus.

References

Further reading
Boulenger GA. 1885. Catalogue of the Lizards in the British Museum (Natural History). Second Edition. Volume II. ... Zonuridæ ... London: Trustees of the British Museum (Natural History). (Taylor and Francis, printers). xiii + 497 pp. + Plates I-XXIV. (Genus Pseudocordylus, p. 259).
Branch, Bill. 2004.  Field Guide to Snakes and other Reptiles of Southern Africa. Third Revised edition, Second impression. Sanibel Island, Florida: Ralph Curtis Books. 399 pp. SBN 0-88359-042-5. (Genus Psdeudocordylus, p. 205).

External links
Broadley DG. 2006. 
Frost DR et al. 2001. 

 
Lizard genera
Taxa named by Andrew Smith (zoologist)